Kurram District is a district in Kohat Division of Khyber Pakhtunkhwa province in Pakistan.The name Kurram comes from the river Kuramá in Pashto which itself derives from the Sanskrit name Krumuḥ.

Until 2018, it was an agency of Federally Administered Tribal Areas, with merger of FATA with Khyber Pakhtunkhwa, it became a district. Geographically, it covers the Kurram Valley region which is a valley in the northwestern part of Pakistan. Most of the population is Pashtun and the main religion is Islam (Shia and Sunni). Major tribes living in Kurram Agency are Bangash, Turi, Orakzai, as well as Mamozai, Muqbil, Zazai, Paracha, Mangal, Ghilzai, Para Chamkani, Hazara and Khoshi tribe (Persian speaking tribe).

Until the year 2000, when the old divisions were abolished, the Kurram District used to be part of the Peshawar Division of the North-West Frontier Province of Pakistan.

Description
The name Kurram comes from the river Kurram, which flows along the valley. In the north it is surrounded by snow-covered or "white" mountains, the Safed Koh, locally known in Pashto as Spīn Ghar, which also forms the natural border with Afghanistan. Kurram Agency is just like a beak of a bird and is connected with three provinces of Afghanistan named as Khost, Paktia and Nangarhar (Tora bora).

Kurram Agency is located in the FATA and its major tribes are Bangash, Turi, Orakzai, Para-Chamkani, Mangal, Alisherzai, Muqbil, Khuaidadkhel and Masozai.

In Lower Kurram Agency, Sadda is a scenic place where tribes such as the Bangash reside and Sadda has natural richness depended upon hills and mountain with evergreen forests and fields for growing crops like rice and wheat.

The Kurram River drains the southern flanks of the Safed Koh mountain range, and enters the Indus plains north of Bannu. It lies between the Miranzai Valley. It is inhabited by the Bangash and Mangal tribes.

History 
In the Rigveda, the Kurrum is mentioned as Krumu. The Kurram Valley in ancient times offered the most direct route to Kabul and Gardez.

The valley is highly irrigated, well populated and crowded with small fortified villages, orchards, and groves, to which a fine background is afforded by the dark pine forests and alpine snows of the Safed Koh. The beauty and climate of the valley attracted some of the Mughal emperors of Delhi, and the remains exist of a garden planted by Shah Jahan. According to the Gazetteer of Kurram, the richness of the land gradually weaned the Turks from their nomadic life. Sections built villages and settled permanently; they ceased to be Kuchi and became Kothi this abandonment of their nomadic habits by the majority of the resulted, as it was bound to do, in a contraction of the area in effective possession. The upper Kurram plain was safe as their headquarters, but hills and slopes below the Safed Koh and Mandher over which their graziers had kept an efficient watch, now afforded a menace as a place in which an encroaching tribe could establish itself. To guard against this settlements of Mangals and Muqbils were half invited half allowed to push themselves in conditions of vassalage, and on promise to afford a buttress against any enemy aggression. In the lower Kurram, where for climatic reasons candidates for settlements were fewer, the problem was not easily solved. The Chardi Turis seem to have been the first to abandon their nomadic life. As the numbers who went down to graze every year became less, the area under control contracted. Sangroba and Hadmela were left far behind and as the Turis receded the Watizai Zaimushts gradually pushed in, until all that was left was a settlement at and about Alizai. On the western side the Saragallas retained, and still largely retain their habits. They too put in settlements around Biliamin and after much intervening warfare had finally to admit Bangashes brother not as vassals, but for the rest they retain unimpaired the rights on the western bank which they acquired at the time the conquest.

With Chardis this was for from being the course left unsupported by their Kuchis they maintained a precarious existence at Alizai until even then they had to give three-fifths of their land to the Watizai Zaimushts in return for their assistance in a feud they had entered upon with Bilyamin. Consequently, the hills and the grazing grounds passed from the Turizun to the Zaimushtzun and as the other Zaimushts section being unopposed had settled themselves on the left bank below Sadda.

In the early 19th century the Kurram Valley was under the government of Kabul, and every five or six years a military expedition was sent to collect the revenue, the soldiers living meanwhile at free quarters on the people. It was not until about 1848 that the Turis were brought directly under the control of Kabul, when a governor was appointed, who established himself in Kurram. The Turis, being Shias, never liked Afghan rule.

During the second Afghan War, when Sir Frederick Roberts advanced by way of the Kurram Valley and the Peiwar Kotal to Kabul, the Turis lent him every assistance in their power, and in consequence, their independence was granted them in 1880.

The administration of the Kurram Valley was finally rendered to British authorities, at the request of the Turis themselves, in 1890. Technically it ranked, not as a British district, but as an agency or administered area. Two expeditions in the Kurram Valley also require mention:

(1) The Kurram expedition of 1856 under Brigadier-General Sir Neville Chamberlain. The Turis, on the first annexation of the Kohat district by the British, had repeatedly leagued with other tribes to infest the Miranzai valley, harbouring fugitives, encouraging resistance, and frequently attacking Bangash and Khattak villages in the Kohat district. Accordingly, in 1856 British forces numbering 4,896 troops traversed their country, and the tribe entered into engagements for future good conduct.

(2) The Kohat-Kurram expedition of 1897 under Colonel W. Hill. During the frontier risings of 1897 the inhabitants of the Kurram valley, chiefly the Massozai section of the Orakzais, were infected by the general excitement, and attacked the British camp at Sadda and other posts. A force of 14,230 British troops traversed the country, and the tribesmen were severely punished. In Lord Curzon's reorganization of the frontier in 1900–1901, British troops were withdrawn from the forts in the Kurram Valley and were replaced by the Kurram militia, reorganized in two battalions, and chiefly drawn from the Turi tribe.

In recent years the Kurram Valley has once again assumed a strategic position and has been the site of intense Taliban activities. The armed forces of Pakistan extended their major offensive against Al-Qaeda and Taliban elements in FATA dubbed Operation Rah-e-Nijat to Kurram in December 2009.

Archeological findings
Ahmad Hasan Dani has recorded several findings in the North Waziristan area.

Demographics 

At the time of the 2017 census the district had a population of 615,372, of which 306,935 were males and 308,393 females. Rural population was 577,327 (93.82%) while the urban population was 38,045 (6.18%). The literacy rate was 40.43% - the male literacy rate was 59.03% while the female literacy rate was 22.92%. 904 people in the district were from religious minorities, mainly Christians. Pashto was the predominant language, spoken by 98.40% of the population.

Administrative divisions 
Kurram District is currently subdivided into three Tehsils.

 Central Kurram Tehsil
 Lower Kurram Tehsil
 Upper Kurram Tehsil

Parachinar Čoṇə́i (Cantonment)
Parachinar is the administrative headquarter of Kurram valley. It has offices of Deputy Commissioner, Assistant Commissioner, Kurram Police, and Kurram Militia, a part of the Frontier Corps (FC) and Pak Army. It is located northwest of the valley. This makes it a part of Upper Kurram. Governor cottage, Shalozan House, Circuit House and Passport office are also located in cantonment area.
The name of Parachinar comes from 'Para' (Paarha), one of the tribes of the valley and 'Chinar', the maple trees which are found in abundance in the region and Parachinar in particular. The old name of Parchinar was Tutki and the inhabitants of Tutki were called Tutkiwal and even still, the Afghans call it Tutki.
The town (sometimes listed as a city) of Parachinar has a population of around five thousand predominantly {Turi}, {Bangash} and {jaji}. The town has government hospital and many government schools.

Provincial Assembly

Major Towns 

 Parachinar is the headquarters of district Kurram and the largest city of the district as well. Turi and Bangash tribes live there.
 Sadda is the second largest city in district Kurram. Predominantly Bangash and Alisherzai tribes live there.
 Dogar is the third largest town in the Kurram Agency.
 Tari Mangal

Major Dams
Kurram Agency has a few water reservoirs locally called Dams. Basically, these are water supply schemes for domestic purposes. No hydroelectric power is generated in these constructions nor are they used for irrigation purpose.

Malana Dam
Located in the north of Parachinar town this dam was constructed in 1857. Most of the population of Parachinar town depend on this reservoir and the dam is a picnic resort for the locals. A guest house is built here by the agency administration.

Zeran Dam
Zeran dam is located to the north-east of Prachinar. It serves water for Parachinar town before the construction of Malana dam, still the dam contributes much water to a large part of the town Parachinar.

Kot Ragha Dam Malikhel
This is a small size reservoir, largest in the Kurram, and was built in Kot Ragha (Malikhel).

Storage of flood water in the reservoir of the dam.
Irrigation of Agriculture lands under its command.
Mitigation of flood hazards and gully erosion at the downstream of the dam.
Recharge to ground water aquifer.
Facilities for fish breeding and wildlife growth.
A forestation on the adjacent hills.
Creation of recreational resort for the community.
Employment opportunities for the local Communities of the area.

Maidani Small Dam
This is a small Dam which is located in Munda near Bilyamin (بليامين) Lower Kurram Agency. Its length is 1062 feet, and height is 86 feet. The benefits of this Dam:

 storage of flood water in the reservoir of the dam.
 Irrigation of Agriculture lands under its command.
 Mitigation of flood hazards and gully erosion at the downstream of the dam.
 Recharge to ground water aquifer.
 Facilities for fish breeding and wildlife growth.
 A forestation on the adjacent hills.
 Creation of recreational resort for the community.
 Employment opportunities for the local Communities of the area.

Climate 
Climate of the valley remains pleasant most of the summer however in winters minimum temperature is usually below freezing point, occasionally mercury drop below -10 degree Celsius. Parachinar is ranked the fourth-coldest location in Pakistan by the weather charts website "Climate-Charts" that uses data available from the World Meteorological Organization.

The northern and western heights of the valley receive snowfalls in winters. Much of the precipitations occur during spring and summer season. Autumn and winter are usually dry. Due to its climatic condition Kurram Agency is known for certain agricultural products throughout Pakistan such as peanut, bean, tomatoes and coarse rice. Wild olive trees are abundantly found along other trees and plants. Maple (chinar) is the identity of Kurram Agency especially Parachinar.

Terrorism

Taliban 
Kurram was a stronghold of the TTP till 2008 when the Pakistani Army ordered a military operation in the Agency to flush out the militants. The military offensive, named Operation Koh-e-Safaid, ended in 2011 with the Lower and Upper Subdivisions of the agency falling back into the Pakistani control. In August, 2012, the Upper and Lower Subdivisions were de-notified as Conflict zones while as a military operation continued in Masozai Area of Central Kurram Agency.

The Kurram faction of Haqqani Network is commanded by the notorious Fazal Saeed Haqqani who is known for his bloody ambushes against Shia community of Kurram Agency. He has thousands of armed supporters from local tribes of Bangash, Watizai, and Daudzai.

Sectarianism 
Kurram Agency has become increasingly victimized by sectarian violence as tensions grew between the Shiites and Sunnis of the agency.

See also
 Peiwar Pass
 Bangash
 Thall
 Beliamen
 Karakhela
 Tari Mangal

References

Bibliography
 Martin, Gerald (1879). "Survey Operations of the Afghanistan Expedition; The Kurram Valley." In Proceedings of the Royal Geographical Society and Monthly Record of Geography, New Monthly Series, Vol. 1, No. 10 (Oct. 1879), pp. 617-645.
 Bowles, Gordon T. (1977). The People of Asia. London. Weidenfeld & Nicolson.
 Scott-Moncrieff, Major-General Sir George K. "The Roads of the North-West Frontier." Blackwood's Magazine, No. MCCCIV, Vol. CCXV, June 1924, pp. 743–757.
 Swinson, Arthur (1967). North-West Frontier. Frederick A. Praeger, New York, Washington.

External links 
 Fata's official site
 Short description of Kurram Agency
 Brief and partial history of Kurram Agency
 Briefly All about Kurram Agency

 
Valleys of Khyber Pakhtunkhwa
Districts of Khyber Pakhtunkhwa